A-Town Secret Weapon is the album by Atlanta-based rapper Baby D, released April 29, 2008. The first single from the album is "I'm bout Money", which features Blaze. A video of the song has been released on March 20, 2008. The album features collaborations with Pastor Troy, Sean P of Youngbloodz, Gucci Mane, Shawty Lo and Blazed.

Surprisingly the track "Yuuugh!", which was meant to be the first single off the album, didn't make it to the final track list. Also, no collaborations with Oomp Camp fellow rapper Unk are found on the record.

Track listing
"Intro" (feat. Dj Jelly)
"U Gotta Love It"
"Big Boy Whips"
"I'm Bout Money" (feat. Blaze)
"So Fresh" (feat. Sandman & Backbone)
"Icey" (feat. Gucci Mane & Shawty Lo)
"Patron"
"Do It"
"Get To It"
"Get It Girl" (feat. Blaze)
"Put Em Up" (feat. Pastor Troy & Sean P)
"One 4 Tha Money"
"Girls Gone Wild" (feat. Blaze)
"Get Out" (feat. Escobar & Loko)
"For My Niggaz"

References

External links
 Baby D's page on Koch Records Website

2008 albums
Baby D (rapper) albums